The Bible Christian Church was a Christian vegetarian sect founded by William Cowherd in Salford, North West England in 1809. To join the church, members had to sign a pledge that committed them to a vegetarian diet and abstention from alcohol. Followers of Cowherd's ideas were commonly known as Bible Christians or "Cowherdites." Cowherd was one of the philosophical forerunners of the Vegetarian Society founded in 1847.

Bible Christians put great emphasis on independence of mind and freedom of belief, stating that they did not presume "to exercise any dominion over the faith or conscience of men." They believed in free will and had a Pelagian approach. They argued that religion when properly understood reveals the same truth to all men. There was no emphasis on original sin or conversion. Man was not saved by faith alone but by his actions and the value of his life as a whole. Vegetarianism formed part of this belief.

Salford and Manchester Bible Christians
William Cowherd founded the Bible Christian Church following a split from the Swedenborgians. Their first chapel was known as Christ Church and located in King Street, Salford, Greater Manchester. The church later moved to new premises in Cross Lane. Further chapels were also established in Hulme and Every Street, Ancoats. One distinctive feature of the Bible Christians was a belief in a meat-free "vegetable diet", known today as ovo-lacto vegetarianism, as a form of temperance.

In 1816 William Cowherd died and Joseph Brotherton was appointed his successor. Brotherton held the position for 40 years until his death in 1857.

By 1932, unable to attract enough vegetarian members, the English Bible Christians merged into the Pendleton Unitarians.

Philadelphia Bible Christians
The church's message was later preached in the United States, as about 40 members under the leadership of the Reverend William Metcalfe and the Reverend James Clark crossed the Atlantic in 1817 and formed the Philadelphia Bible Christian Church. These members subsequently provided a nucleus for the American vegetarian movement.

References

Further reading
 William E.A. Axon (1909) A History of the Bible Christian Church, Salford: From 1809 to 1909
 Philadelphia Bible Christian Church Maintenance Committee (1922) History of the Philadelphia Bible-Christian Church for the First Century of Its Existence: From 1817 to 1917
 Derek Antrobus (1997) A Guiltless Feast: The Salford Bible Christian Church and the rise of the modern vegetarian movement

External links
 Vegetarian roots: The extraordinary tale of William Cowherd by Karen Millington, BBC (17 December 2012)

Religious organizations established in 1809
Christian denominations established in the 19th century
Former Christian denominations
Christian vegetarianism
1809 establishments in England